Church of the Visitation of the Blessed Virgin Mary is a church complex off NE 56 in O'Connor, Nebraska. It was added to the National Register of Historic Places in 1984.

It is also known as the O'Connor Church Complex.  The main building is the church (1904–05), which is brick and soaring and Romanesque Revival in style.  There is also a rectory (1929–30), a plain parish hall (1954–55), a cemetery, and surrounding windbreaks and other land.

The land was purchased in 1879 by the Irish Catholic Colonization Association of the U.S. which was organized in part "to aid the social, economic, and religious conditions of the Irish-American urban poor by assisting their relocation from eastern cities to farms in Minnesota and Nebraska."  In total  in the area was purchased from the Burlington and Missouri Railroad, and townsites of O'Connor and Spalding were opened in 1880.

The church was designed by architect James H. Craddock.

It is located off Nebraska Highway 56.

References

Churches in the Roman Catholic Diocese of Grand Island
Churches on the National Register of Historic Places in Nebraska
Romanesque Revival church buildings in Nebraska
Roman Catholic churches completed in 1879
Churches in Greeley County, Nebraska
National Register of Historic Places in Greeley County, Nebraska
1879 establishments in Nebraska
19th-century Roman Catholic church buildings in the United States